The 1897 Romford by-election was held on 1 February 1897 after the retirement of the incumbent Conservative MP Alfred Money Wigram.  The seat was retained by the Conservative Party candidate Louis Sinclair.

References 

By-elections to the Parliament of the United Kingdom in Essex constituencies
February 1897 events
Romford
1897 elections in the United Kingdom
1897 in England
1890s in Essex